Acotylea is a suborder of free-living marine turbellarian flatworms in the order Polycladida.

Taxonomy 
 Superfamily Cryptoceloidea Faubel, 1984
 Family Cryptocelidae Laidlaw, 1903
 Family Discocelididae Laidlaw, 1903
 Family Ilyplanidae Faubel, 1983
 Family Plehniidae Bock, 1913
 Family Polyposthiidae Bergendal, 1893
 Superfamily Leptoplanoidea Faubel, 1984
 Family Candimboididae Faubel, 1983
 Family Faubelidae Ozdikmen, 2010
 Family Gnesiocerotidae Marcus and Marcus, 1966
 Family Leptoplanidae Stimpson, 1857
 Family Mucroplanidae Faubel, 1983
 Family Notocomplanidae Litvaitis, Bolaños & Quiroga, 2019
 Family Notoplanidae Marcus and Marcus, 1966
 Family Palauidae Faubel, 1983
 Family Pleioplanidae Faubel, 1983
 Family Stylochoplanidae Meixner, 1907
 Superfamily Stylochoidea Stimpson, 1857
 Family Callioplanidae Hyman, 1953
 Family Discoprosthididae Faubel, 1983
 Family Hoploplanidae Stummer-Traunfels, 1933
 Family Latocestidae Laidlaw, 1903
 Family Planoceridae Lang, 1884
 Family Pseudostylochidae Faubel, 1983
 Family Stylochidae Stimpson, 1857
 Not placed in any Superfamily
 Family Anocellidae Quiroga, Bolanos & Litvaitis, 2006
 Family Apidioplanidae Bock, 1926
 Family Didangiidae Faubel, 1983
 Family Enantiidae Graff, 1889
 Family Euplanidae Marcus & Marcus, 1966
 Family Limnostylochidae Faubel, 1983
 Family Stylochocestidae Bock, 1913

See also
Kaburakia excelsa

References

External links 

Turbellaria